Chen Jin (born 4 May 1964) is a Chinese actress. Chen is noted for her roles as Wang Ruhui in the film Roaring Across the Horizon.

Early life
Chen was born into a military family in Jinan, Shandong, the daughter of Chen Kemin, a professor at PLA National Defence University. Her elder brother Chen Zhun is a fashion photographer. Chen graduated from Shandong University of Arts in 1987, majoring in drama. After graduation, she was assigned to the People's Liberation Army Air Force Drama Group as an actress.

Acting career
Chen's first film role was uncredited appearance in the film Woman Criminal (1992).

In 1997, Chen acted with Li Yapeng, Pan Yueming, and Jiang Chao in the television series Student Hero and won the Outstanding Actress Award at the Flying Apsaras Award.

For her role as Wang Ruhui in Roaring Across the Horizon, Chen won the Golden Rooster Award for Best Supporting Actress, Huabiao Award for Outstanding Actress, and Best Supporting Actress Award at the Changchun Film Festival.

In 2002, Chen earned her second Flying Apsaras Award for Outstanding Actress for her performance as Zhu Huiyun in My Sister-in-law.

Chen had a minor role as a middle-aged women in Ma Liwen's romantic comedy film Desires of the Heart (2006), which starred Vivian Wu, Ge You, and Fan Bingbing.

In 2003, Chen played the role of Lin Zihan in Grand Justice, for which she won the Favorite Actress Award at the Golden Eagle Awards.

In 2007, Chen had a cameo appearance in Zhang Yimou's Curse of the Golden Flower, a historical film starring Chow Yun-fat, Gong Li, and Jay Chou, a financial success that took in $78,568,977 at the box office worldwide.

In 2009, Chen starred with Xu Fan, Zhang Jingchu, Chen Daoming, and Li Chen in Huayi Brothers's production of Aftershock, directed by Feng Xiaogang.

In 2012, Chen starred in The Doctors, for which she received Favorite Actress Award nomination at the Golden Eagle Awards.

Filmography

Film

Television

Drama

Awards

References

1964 births
Living people
Actresses from Jinan
Shandong University of Arts alumni
Chinese film actresses
Chinese television actresses